Jach'a Pukara (Aymara jach'a big, pukara fortress, "big fortress", Hispanicized spelling Jachcha Pucara) is a  mountain in the Andes of Bolivia. It is situated in the La Paz Department, Inquisivi Province, Quime Municipality. Jach'a Pukara lies at the river Chaka Jawira whose waters flow to the La Paz River in the north.

References 

Mountains of La Paz Department (Bolivia)